Hossein Alizadeh (born 24 January 1988) is an Iranian cyclist, who currently rides for UCI Continental team . A former national champion, Alizadeh is an extremely powerful climber and, at his best, matches the best time-trialists. He is both able to sustain a high intensity during long, steep climb and he is feared and famous in Asia tours for his explosive attacks that often leaves the front group split into pieces.

Career
Born in Tabriz, Alizadeh took his first international stage win as well as the overall win in Tour de East Java in 2010. Then the same year in Tour of Qinghai Lake (2.HC) placed 2nd in mountain classification and ninth overall. In 2012, after winning the Tour of Qinghai Lake as well as the mountain classification, he won the 2011–12 UCI Asia Tour.

Major results
Source:

2007
 7th Overall Taftan Tour
 8th Overall Kerman Tour
2008
 2nd Overall Taftan Tour
 2nd Overall Milad De Nour Tour
2009
 7th Overall Tour of Azerbaijan (Iran)
2010
 1st Overall Tour de East Java
1st Stage 1
 5th Overall International Presidency Tour
 9th Overall Tour of Qinghai Lake
2011
 1st Stage 3 (TTT) Tour of Azerbaijan (Iran)
 2nd Overall Milad De Nour Tour
 3rd Overall Tour de East Java
 7th Overall International Presidency Tour
 9th Overall Kerman Tour
2012
 1st Overall 2011–12 UCI Asia Tour
 1st  Road race, National Road Championships
 1st  Overall Tour of Qinghai Lake
1st  Mountains classification
1st  Asian rider classification
1st Stage 3
 8th Overall Tour of Azerbaijan (Iran)
2013
 4th Overall Tour of Iran (Azerbaijan)
 10th Overall Tour of Qinghai Lake
2014
 4th Overall Tour de Singkarak
1st Stage 2
 6th Overall Tour de Filipinas
2015
 2nd Overall Tour of Qinghai Lake
 10th Overall Tour of Iran (Azerbaijan)

References

External links

1988 births
Living people
Iranian male cyclists
Sportspeople from Tabriz
21st-century Iranian people